Pedro Pulido Pecero (born 23 July 1969) is a Mexican politician from the National Action Party. From 2006 to 2009, he served as Deputy of the LX Legislature of the Mexican Congress representing Veracruz.

References

1963 births
Living people
Politicians from Veracruz
National Action Party (Mexico) politicians
21st-century Mexican politicians
Autonomous University of Tamaulipas alumni
Deputies of the LX Legislature of Mexico
Members of the Chamber of Deputies (Mexico) for Veracruz